Lee Jong-sung (born 5 August 1992) is a South Korean professional footballer who plays as a midfielder for K League 1 club Suwon Samsung Bluewings.

References

External links 
 

1992 births
Living people
People from Dangjin
South Korean footballers
South Korea under-17 international footballers
South Korea under-20 international footballers
South Korea under-23 international footballers
Association football midfielders
Suwon Samsung Bluewings players
Gimcheon Sangmu FC players
Daegu FC players
Seongnam FC players
K League 1 players
K League 2 players